Rodolfo Páez Ávalos, popularly known as Fito Páez (born 13 March 1963), is an Argentine popular rock and roll pianist, lyricist, singer-songwriter and film director.

Biography

Early career

Paez was born in Rosario, Santa Fe Province; his real name is Rodolfo Paez, like his father. When he was a child people called him "Rodolfito" (in Spanish, an affectionate form of "Rodolfo") to distinguish him from his father. With the passage of time, this nickname became just "Fito", and that is where his stage name came from.

He formed Staff, his first band when he was 13. In 1977, he played in El Banquete with Rubén Goldín and Jorge Llonch. He began to perform solo in pubs the following year. 

Straight out of high school, he began touring with several bands and soon after that produced his first solo album, Del '63, which was released in 1984. It was promoted first in his home town, but later earned attention in Buenos Aires. The recording was put together with the help of some of Argentina's most prominent musicians, including Daniel Wirtz, Fabián Gallardo, Tweety González and Paul Dourge.
The disc won him critical acclaim as a songwriter and helped lead to future projects, including a 1985 album, Giros. The demo of that album earned him the praise of Luis Alberto Spinetta, as well as a partnership – Paez's next album, 1986's La La La was a duet with Spinetta. The duo supported that album with a tour that reached all the way to Santiago, Chile. The same year, he participated in the Thousand Days of Democracy festival.

His 1987 recording, Ciudad de Pobres Corazones, marked a dark, political turn for his work. It was dedicated to the memory of his aunt and grandmother, who were assassinated in Rosario. Páez got his first taste of production work with Ey!, which was released in 1988. Recorded in New York City and Havana, it also showcased many musicians with whom he had worked previously.

1990–present

Tercer Mundo, released in 1990, explored Latin American cultural influences and the harsh world of poverty and exploitation. It too was critically acclaimed, but it was Páez's 1992 album, El Amor Después del Amor which marked the pinnacle of his commercial success. The album sold more than 750,000 copies and when Páez toured to support it, he found himself playing to sold-out shows for 40,000 people. Shortly after this album's release, he played a benefit concert for UNICEF which raised more than $420,000.

In 1990, Páez worked as a producer in Sandra Mihanovich and Celeste Carballo's album Mujer contra mujer.

The follow-up, Circo Beat, had impossibly high expectations and though it had several hit songs, including "Mariposa Tecknicolor" and "Tema de Piluso," as well as a companion album, Circo Beat Brazil, which featured Brazilian remixes of its hits, it only sold around 350,000 copies. Several other projects were completed in the late '90s, including a live album, Euforia and 1998's Sabina & Páez: Enemigos Intimos, with Joaquín Sabina. The year 1999 brought another balanced, superbly produced album, Abre. He also took home two Grammys at the first annual Latin Grammy Awards in fall 2000. He lived with Argentine actress Cecilia Roth for some years; the couple adopted a child in 1999.

Páez's 2003 album Naturaleza sangre marked a return to his musical past, featuring appearances from Charly García, Luis Alberto Spinetta and Brazilian artist Rita Lee on the previously unreleased version of "Ojos Rojos". In 2006, Páez was given an escopetarra (a decommissioned AK-47 converted into a guitar) by Colombian musician and peace activist César López in honor of his music.

The album El mundo cabe en una canción won the Latin Grammy Award for Best Rock Solo Vocal Album at the Latin Grammy Awards of 2007. In 2008 Páez recorded, No se si es Baires o Madrid, in Madrid, Spain. He invited several important musicians such as Pablo Milanés, Joaquín Sabina and Ariel Rot to participate. In 2010, he released the album Confiá.. In December 2011 he recorded a new album with songs by other artists performed by Páez himself in a release called Canciones para áliens. This album was presented at la Sala Nezahualcoyolt de la Universidad Nacional Autónoma de México. In January 2012, these "songs for the aliens" were transmitted to space via electromagnetic waves through the Music to Space project. In 2021, Páez was presented with the Latin Grammy Lifetime Achievement Award.

Discography

Studio albums

Del 63 (1984)
Giros (1985)
La la la (1986) (with Luis Alberto Spinetta)
Ciudad de pobres corazones (1987)
Ey! (1988)
Tercer mundo (1990)
El Amor Después del Amor (1992)
Circo Beat (1994)
Enemigos íntimos (1998) (with Joaquín Sabina)
Abre (1999)
Rey Sol (2000) 
Naturaleza sangre (2003) 
Moda y pueblo (2005) 
El Mundo Cabe en Una Canción (2006) 
Rodolfo (2007)
Confiá (2010) 
Canciones para Aliens (2011)
El Sacrificio (2013) 
Dreaming Rosario (2013)
Yo Te Amo (2013) 
Rock and Roll Revolution – RRR (2014)
Locura total (2015) (with Paulinho Moska)
La ciudad liberada (2017)
La Conquista del Espacio (2020)
Los Años Salvajes (2021)
Futurología Arlt (2022)
The Golden Light (2022)

Live albums
Euforia (1996)
Mi vida con ellas (2004) 
No sé si es Baires o Madrid (2008)
El amor después del amor 20 años (2012)

Collaboration albums
La La La (with Luis Alberto Spinetta) (1986)
Enemigos íntimos (with Joaquín Sabina) (1998)
Locura total (with Paulinho Moska) (2015)

Compilation albums
 Grandes éxitos (1990) 
 Crónica (1991) 
 Lo mejor de Fito Páez (1993) 
 Lo mejor de los mejores – Volume 1 and 2 (1995/1996) 
 Lo duro/Lo suave de Fito Páez (1996)
 Colección aniversario (1999)
 Fue amor (2000) 
 Antología (2002) 
 Serie de oro: grandes éxitos (2002)
 Músicos, poetas y locos (2003) 
 Super 6 (2003)
 Gran reserva (2005) 
 Grandes canciones (2008)

Tributes
 Homenaje a Fito Páez (2006)

Filmography
Vidas privadas ("Private lives") (2001)
¿De quién es el portaligas? (2007) ("Whose is the garter belt?")

Awards and nominations

Grammy Awards

Latin Grammy Awards

Note: At the 1st Annual Latin Grammy Awards, Frank Filipetti received a nomination for Best Engineered Album as engineer for Abre.Note: At the 13th Annual Latin Grammy Awards, Alejandro Ros received a nomination for Best Recording Package as the art director for Canciones Para Aliens.

References

Further reading
Horacio Vargas: Fito Páez – La biografía – La vida después de la vida. Homosapiens, Buenos Aires 1994; .

External links
 
 
  Fito Páez Biography (1/5) YouTube.com

1963 births
Musicians from Rosario, Santa Fe
Living people
20th-century Argentine male singers
Argentine people of Spanish descent
Latin Grammy Award winners
Singers from Rosario, Santa Fe
Rock en Español musicians
Argentine pianists
Sony Music Latin artists
Latin music songwriters
Rock songwriters
Male pianists
21st-century pianists
21st-century Argentine male singers
Argentine male singer-songwriters
Grammy Award winners
Latin Grammy Lifetime Achievement Award winners